Frank Tusa (born April 1, 1947) is an American jazz double-bassist, composer, educator.

Tusa played guitar before switching to bass at age ten. He worked in a Broadway pit orchestra and then played while serving in the Army. Tusa worked with Paul Bley (1970–71), Horacee Arnold (1971), and in the Open Sky trio with Dave Liebman and Rakalam Bob Moses in 1972-74. Early in the 1970s he also played with Dave Holland, Collin Walcott, and Dom Um Romão, the last on electric bass. In the middle of the decade he toured Europe in Dave Liebman's Lookout Farm ensemble with Richard Beirach, Jeff Williams, and Badal Roy. He recorded around this time with Barry Miles, Booker Ervin, Don Cherry, Freddie Hubbard, Lee Konitz, and Harold Mabern.Tusa has had a wide variety of recording, and performing experiences with such diverse artists as Art Blakey, Buddy Montgomery, Stan Getz, Chet Baker, Pepper Adams, Shelly Manne, Bobby Hutcherson, Johnny Griffin, Herb Ellis, Art Farmer, Randy Brecker, Freddie Hubbard, John Abercrombie, George Cables and many other great jazz artists.  Tusa’s early recordings are with jazz legends Paul Bley, Don Cherry and Dave Liebman.  Frank was one of the original members of Dave Liebman’s critically acclaimed group “Lookout Farm”.

In 1980 Frank relocated to San Francisco after spending many years learning and working through the ranks of his native New York City scene.  After arriving in San Francisco he very quickly became known as one of the finest musicians in the bay area and has been in constant demand for his solid rhythmic anchoring and eloquent melodic lines.  He has also been very active in music education teaching at San Jose State University and Stanford University.

His first album as a leader was released on Enja Records in 1975 which has been remastered in 24 bite and re-released in 2006. 1977 saw him collaborating with Art Blakey. and working in the Eon trio. He played in San Francisco in the 1980s.

Discography

As leader
Reunion of Old Spirits (Tuse Records, 1997)
Father Time (Enja Records, 1975)

As sideman
Paul Bley: The Paul Bley Synthesizer Show (Milestone, 1971)
Richard Beirach: Eon (ECM, 1974)
David Liebman: Lookout Farm (ECM, 1973)
David Liebman: Sweet Hands (Horizon, 1975)
David Liebman Quintet: Pendulum (Artists House, 1978)
Chet Baker: Live & Rare (2011-Master Classics Records)
John Handy & Mel Martin: Bebop and Beyond (1984-Concord Records)
Chet Baker: Out of the Blue- Live at the Dutch Sesjun Radio Show-1980(Released in 2010)
Chet Baker: Live at the Great American Music Hall, San Francisco (1982-GAMH )
Bobbe Norris & Larry Dunlap: Hoisted Sails (1984-Palo Alto Records)
Hi-Lo’s: Live in Japan at Budakan Hall, Tokyo Japan
Paul Bley: The Paul Bley Synthesizer Show (1970-Milestones)
Richard Beirach: Methusalah (1975-Trio Records)
Richard Beirach: Sunday Song (1975-Trio Records)
Barry Miles: Scatbird (1972-Mainstream Records)
Dom Um Romao: Spirit of the Times
Badal Roy: Ashibad (1975-Trio Records)
Badal Roy: Passing Dreams (1975- Adamo)
Fred Tompkins: Cecile (1978-F.K.T. Records)
Rimona Francis: (1977-MPS Records)
Vibraphone Summit Tour with Karl Berger: (1978-MPS Records)
Dave Liebman: Keeper of the Past
Dave Liebman: Open Sky (1972-PM Records)
Dave Liebman: Spirit in the Sky (1975-PM Records)
Dave Liebman: Nightscapes (1970 CBS/Sony -Japan)

References

"Frank Tusa". Grove Jazz online.

External links
 Frank Tusa, Bassist - Official Website including audio files
 Reunion of Old Spirits - CD Album with Dave Liebman, John Abercrombie, Richard Beirach,  Jeff Williams 
 All Music Guide - Lookout Farm album review
 Mosaic Records - CD Album Pendulum
 ECM Records - CD Album Eon
 ECM Records - CD Album Lookout Farm

American jazz double-bassists
Male double-bassists
Musicians from New York (state)
Living people
American jazz educators
21st-century double-bassists
1947 births
21st-century American male musicians
American male jazz musicians
Bebop & Beyond members